A parietal foramen is an opening in the skull for the parietal emissary vein, which drains into the superior sagittal sinus. Occasionally, a small branch of the occipital artery can also pass through it. It is located at the back part of the parietal bone, close to the upper or sagittal border. It is not always present, and its size varies considerably. Parietal foramina tend to be symmetrical, with the same number on each side.

See also
 Foramina of skull

References

External links

Foramina of the skull